Valentin Solomonovich Tublin  (born May 23, 1934, Leningrad, USSR)  is a Soviet and Israeli coach in archery, writer. Coach Israeli Olympic team archery (1991-1996).

References

External links 
 ЖЗ
   Энциклопедия Фантастики

1934 births
Living people
Israeli sports coaches
Soviet sports coaches
Russian male poets
Soviet poets
Soviet male writers
20th-century Russian male writers
Russian-language poets
Saint-Petersburg State University of Architecture and Civil Engineering alumni
20th-century Russian writers
Israeli translators
Russian translators
Translators from Hebrew